The Great Mall of the Bay Area (often simply called The Great Mall) is a large indoor outlet shopping mall in Milpitas, California built by Ford Motor Land Development and Petrie Dierman Kughn in 1994. It was acquired by Mills Corporation in 2003, and by the Simon Property Group in April 2007. The mall contains approximately 1.4 million square feet of gross leaseable area. The anchor stores are Century Theatres, Kohl's, Dick's Sporting Goods, Home Interiors Furniture, Q, Saks Off 5th, Marshalls, Burlington, Dave & Buster's and the Legoland Discovery Center.

History
The Mall was formerly the Ford San Jose Assembly Plant that was built in 1955.  Ford Mustangs were produced at this plant and Mustangs bearing the name San Jose as the assembly location were in fact built in Milpitas.  Fairlanes, Torinos, Pintos, F-Series pickup trucks and Escorts; Edsel Rangers and Pacers; and Mercury Cougars, Montegos, Comets, Bobcats, Lynxes, & Capris (US version) were also assembled here. The plant closed down in 1983 in part due to increasing competition with Japanese auto manufacturers. In the early 1990s, developers resized the former plant and converted it into a mall. Today, an oak tree with a plaque commemorating Great Mall's history stands in the southwest section of its parking lot.

The Great Mall of the Bay Area, which opened on September 22, 1994, was developed as a joint venture between Ford Motor Land Development Corporation of Dearborn, Michigan and Petrie Dierman Kughn of McLean, Virginia.

In 2016, it was announced that the mall would be undergoing renovation in the spring.

Location
The Great Mall of the Bay Area sits at the intersection of Great Mall Parkway (which becomes Capitol Avenue when it crosses Montague Expressway) and Montague Expressway. The Parc Metropolitan apartments lie to the north of the mall. A few inns are also located at the south entrance of the mall.

Layout
Great Mall, unlike many other malls (but like most Mills malls), is a "flat" mall with only one story and an oval racetrack layout with six neighborhoods. The mall is currently laid out in this fashion because the existing main structure was a Ford automobile assembly plant and was not designed to serve as a shopping center.

Based on gross leasable area, the Great Mall of the Bay Area is the largest outlet mall and the 8th largest mall in California. It was once the largest mall in Northern California, but has now been surpassed by others. Like other malls, Great Mall also has a food court, which can be accessed through Entrance 4.

Public transit

The Great Mall of the Bay Area is close to the Santa Clara Valley Transportation Authority's Great Mall/Main station. Many VTA bus routes and also one by AC Transit stop at this transit center.  The light rail station is elevated in the median of Great Mall Parkway. Bay Area Rapid Transit opened service to Milpitas station on June 13, 2020, providing access to the Great Mall and connections with VTA and AC Transit.

References

External links 
 

Outlet malls in the United States
Simon Property Group
Shopping malls established in 1994
Shopping malls in Santa Clara County, California
Buildings and structures in Milpitas, California
1994 establishments in California